Posey Township is one of thirteen townships in Washington County, Indiana, United States. As of the 2010 census, its population was 1,888 and it contained 823 housing units.

Geography

Cities, towns, villages
 Fredericksburg
 Hardinsburg

Unincorporated towns
 Fayetteville at 
(This list is based on USGS data and may include former settlements.)

Adjacent townships
 Howard Township (northeast)
 Jackson Township (east)
 Morgan Township, Harrison County (southeast)
 Blue River Township, Harrison County (south)
 Whiskey Run Township, Crawford County (southwest)
 Southeast Township, Orange County (west)
 Madison Township (northwest)

Cemeteries
The township contains these two cemeteries: Old Unity and Walton.

Rivers
 Blue River

School districts
 West Washington School Corporation

Political districts
 Indiana's 9th congressional district
 State House District 73
 State Senate District 44

References
 United States Census Bureau 2007 TIGER/Line Shapefiles
 United States Board on Geographic Names (GNIS)
 IndianaMap

External links
 Indiana Township Association
 United Township Association of Indiana

Townships in Washington County, Indiana
Townships in Indiana